The 2018 Pakistan Cup was the third edition of the Pakistan Cup, a List A cricket competition which was contested between five teams. It was held from 25 April to 6 May 2018, with all the matches played at the Iqbal Stadium, Faisalabad. Federal Areas were the defending champions.

Federal Areas were the first team to advance to the final, after they beat Punjab by 7 wickets. They were joined in the final with Khyber Pakhtunkhwa, after the last group stage match, between Punjab and Sindh, finished as a tie. Federal Areas won the tournament, beating Khyber Pakhtunkhwa by five wickets in the final.

Squads
Prior to the start of the tournament, the following squads were announced:

Group stage

Points table

 Teams qualified for the final

Fixtures

Final

References

External links
 Series home at ESPN Cricino

2018 in Pakistani cricket
2018 in Punjab, Pakistan
21st century in Faisalabad
April 2018 sports events in Pakistan
Cricket in Faisalabad
May 2018 sports events in Pakistan
2018